Jakob Zajc (born 12 May 2003) is a Slovenian professional basketball player who last played for FMP of the Basketball League of Serbia.

Professional career 
In September 2021, Zajc officially signed his first professional contract with FMP. On 19 June 2022, he made his professional debut in a 71–19 loss to Crvena zvezda mts in the game 2 of the 2022 Serbian League Finals.

References

External links 
 Jakob Zajc at eurobasket.com
 Jakob Zajc at realgm.com
 Jakob Zajc at ABA League
 Jakob Zajc at proballers.com

2003 births
Living people
Basketball League of Serbia players
KK FMP players
Point guards
Slovenian 3x3 basketball players
Slovenian expatriate basketball people in Serbia
Slovenian men's basketball players
Basketball players from Ljubljana